Tyler George (born October 6, 1982) is an American curler from Duluth, Minnesota. He is a three-time U.S. Champion, 2016 World bronze medalist, and 2018 Olympic gold medalist. Since the 2018 Olympics, he has taken a break from playing competitive curling, instead spending time as an ambassador and coach for the sport.

Curling career

Juniors 
George competed at the United States Junior National Championships several times but never made it past the semifinals. However, in 2001 he was invited to be the alternate on Andy Roza's team at the 2001 World Junior Curling Championships, where they defeated Scotland's David Edwards in the bronze medal match.

In 2002 George teamed up with Shellan Reed and Patti Luke, two of the previous year's Minnesota Women's Club State Champions, and Gary Luke, to play as a mixed team. They won the Minnesota Mixed State Championship and made it to the finals of the National Mixed Championship, ultimately earning silver medals after losing to Brady Clark's team.

2008–2014: Early men's career 
George's first trip to the Men's National Championship was in 2008. He skipped his team of Kris Perkovich, Phill Drobnick, and Kevin Johnson to a fifth place finish, missing the playoffs when they lost a tiebreaker to four-time national champion Jason Larway. The next year Mark Haluptzok replaced Drobnick on Team George and they returned to the National Championship, which doubled as the Olympic Trials for the 2010 Winter Olympics. They finished the round-robin with only one loss, securing the number one seed in the page playoffs. They lost the final to John Shuster by one point, with a final score of 9–10, settling for silver medals and giving the Olympic berth to Shuster.

For a single season, 2009–10, George joined Pete Fenson's team at lead. They won the 2010 United States Men's Championship, earning George his first chance to represent the United States at Men's Worlds. The 2010 World Men's Championship was held in Cortina d'Ampezzo, Italy and Team Fenson finished in fourth when they lost to Scotland's Warwick Smith in the 3 vs. 4 page playoff game.

After leaving the Fenson team George again formed his own team, consisting of Chris Plys, Rich Ruohonen and Phill Drobnick. They played in the 2011 US Nationals, where they went through the round robin with a 7–2 win–loss record. They were defeated by George's former skip Fenson in the 1 vs. 2 page playoffs and again in the final, earning George his second US silver medal. Colin Hufman replaced Drobnick the following season and they finished the 2012 US Nationals in eighth place. The 2013 National Championship yielded better results, again earning the silver medal, this time losing to Brady Clark in the final. Their runner-up finish qualified the team to participate at the 2013 United States Olympic Curling Trials, where they finished tied for third place.

2014–2018: Gold with Team Shuster 
After the 2014 Winter Olympics, the United States Curling Association held an athlete combine to determine which curlers to include in their High Performance Program (HPP), aimed at having better success at the next Olympics. George did not attend due to his work. After the combine John Shuster, three-time Olympian at that point, was dropped from the HPP and in response created a new team nicknamed "The Rejects", bringing on fellow combine rejects John Landsteiner and Matt Hamilton at lead and second, respectively, and George at third. They maintained this line-up for four seasons and found great success. At the National Championships in  they defeated both HPP teams to win the gold medal. As a result of its success, Team Shuster was added to the High Performance Program for 2016.

In Basel, Switzerland they defeated Japan's Yusuke Morozumi in the bronze medal match, earning the first World Men's medal for the United States since 2007.

At the 2017 United States Olympic Curling Trials George and his team beat Heath McCormick's team in a best-of-three final series to earn his first trip to the Olympics. At the 2018 Winter Olympics in PyeongChang, the US team lost four of its first six matches and needed to win all of its three remaining matches to qualify for the playoffs, but all of its remaining opponents (Canada, Switzerland, and Great Britain) were currently among the top four teams.  Nevertheless, the US team won all three matches to finish the round-robin in third place with a record of 5–4. In the semifinals they defeated Canada's Kevin Koe, a two-time world champion, to reach the gold-medal match versus Niklas Edin's team representing Sweden. The gold-medal game was close through seven ends, with the score tied 5–5, but the United States scored five in the eighth end to set up a 10–7 victory. This was the first Olympic gold medal in curling for the United States.

2018–present: Sports ambassador and coach 
After winning gold, George elected to temporarily step away from curling, citing his desires to take time off to "...recharge the battery, let my body heal." He has become a sports ambassador for the United States Curling Association, making appearances and doing outreach to the curling community in the United States.

George coached Luc Violette's Team United States at the 2020 World Junior Curling Championships. They finished in seventh place.

Personal life
George works as a general manager for George's Liquor.

Teams

Men's

Mixed

Mixed doubles

References

External links

Sportspeople from Duluth, Minnesota
1982 births
American male curlers
Living people
American curling champions
Continental Cup of Curling participants
Curlers at the 2018 Winter Olympics
Olympic curlers of the United States
Medalists at the 2018 Winter Olympics
Olympic gold medalists for the United States in curling
American curling coaches